Clarence Wilbur "Buster" Bray (April 1, 1913 – September 4, 1982) was a professional baseball player. He played in four games in Major League Baseball for the Boston Braves in 1941, three of them in center field.

External links

Major League Baseball outfielders
Boston Braves players
Alexandria Aces players
Gainesville G-Men players
Abbeville A's players
Waycross Bears players
Evansville Bees players
Bridgeport Bees players
Baseball players from Alabama
1913 births
1982 deaths